The Adventures of Chich was a Canadian children's television series which aired on CBC Television from 1958 to 1959.

Premise
This series marked the return of puppet characters Uncle Chichimus (Let's See) and Hollyhock, his niece and housekeeper. Each episode featured a human cast member played in rotation by Tom Kneebone, Larry Mann or Helene Winston. John Conway was the series creator, producer and puppeteer.

Alternate titles were Uncle Chichimus and Uncle Chichimus Tells a Story.

Scheduling
The 15-minute series was broadcast Mondays at 5:15 p.m. (Eastern) from 6 October 1958 to 23 March 1959.

References

External links
 
 

CBC Television original programming
1958 Canadian television series debuts
1959 Canadian television series endings
1950s Canadian children's television series
Black-and-white Canadian television shows
Canadian television shows featuring puppetry